Salvador Ruiz may refer to:

 Salvador Ruiz (swimmer) (born 1938), Mexican swimmer
 Salvador Ruiz Sánchez (born 1961), Mexican politician
 Salva Ruiz (born 1995), Spanish footballer